The 1930 Hamilton municipal election was held on December 1, 1930 to select one Mayor, four Controllers, and sixteen members of the Hamilton, Ontario, City Council, two from each of the city's eight wards. Voters also cast ballots for trustees for the public school board.

Campaign

The 1930 campaign was marked by two major occurrences. The first was the absence of a vote on the city's Hydro Commissioner. Unlike in past elections, voters in Hamilton would not have the option to elect their representative to the publicly owned hydro-electric company for the city due to changes in provincial legislation that created an appointed board of three individuals to replace the single elected office of Commissioner. Attempting to de-politicize the office, Ontario's provincial government abolished the elected position and created a three-person board with appointees to be chosen by Queen's Park, city council, and the mayor.

The second event was the surprise nomination of local athlete Sam Manson for a seat on the Board of Control. Unbeknownst to any more than a dozen of Manson's closest friends, his nomination caught the city's local political establishment by surprise. When rumours of a last-minute entry began circulating city hall at 10:00 the morning of Friday, November 21, the city's sitting aldermen and controllers began questioning the city clerk. Refusing to reveal who the candidate was until five minutes before the close of nominations, the city clerk reportedly faced a "barrage of questioning" from local politicians.

Overall, interest in the election of 1930 was low, in part because of the worsening economic situation faced by Hamiltonians due to the Great Depression. The Hamilton Spectator reported that less than 30 people attended the traditional post-nomination speeches by candidates at city hall.

Mayor

Mayor John Peebles, who had been acclaimed to his first term in 1929, was returned to a second-term by acclamation once more in 1930. In his nomination speech, Peebles spoke at length about the successes of his administration over the previous year, including the opening of McMaster University in Hamilton, improvements to the city's waterworks, and new facilities for the Canadian National Railway. In their summary of the city's nominations, the Spectator noted that "no other hand but [Peebles'] could as successfully pilot the civic ship out of the shoals of depression."

|-
!rowspan="2" colspan="2"|Candidate
!rowspan="2" colspan="1"|Affiliation
!colspan="3"|Popular vote
|-
! Votes
! %
! ±%
|-

| style="text-align:left;" | John Peebles (incumbent)
| style="text-align:left;" | Independent
!colspan="3" style="text-align:center;" | Acclaimed
|-
| style="text-align:right;background-color:#FFFFFF;" colspan="3" |Total votes
| style="text-align:right;background-color:#FFFFFF;" |n/a
| style="text-align:right;background-color:#FFFFFF;" |n/a
| style="text-align:right;background-color:#FFFFFF;" |
|-
| style="text-align:right;background-color:#FFFFFF;" colspan="3" |Registered voters
| style="text-align:right;background-color:#FFFFFF;" |n/a
| style="text-align:right;background-color:#FFFFFF;" |n/a
| style="text-align:right;background-color:#FFFFFF;" |n/a
|-
| style="text-align:left;" colspan="6" |Note: Candidate campaign colours are used as a visual differentiation between candidates and to indicate affiliation.
|-
| style="text-align:left;" colspan="13" |Sources: "Sam R. Manson is real dark horse", Hamilton Spectator, Friday, November 21, 1930, pg. 7.
|}

Board of Control

|-
!rowspan="2" colspan="2"|Candidate
!rowspan="2" colspan="1"|Affiliation
!colspan="3"|Popular vote
|-
! Votes
! %
! ±%

| style="text-align:left;" | Sam Manson
| style="text-align:left;" |Independent
| style="text-align:right;" |15,413
| style="text-align:right;" |n/a
| style="text-align:right;" |n/a

| style="text-align:left;" | Donald MacFarlane (incumbent)
| style="text-align:left;" | Independent Conservative
| style="text-align:right;" |14,866
| style="text-align:right;" |n/a
| style="text-align:right;" |n/a

| style="text-align:left;" | Cranmer Riselay
| style="text-align:left;" | Independent
| style="text-align:right;" |13,033
| style="text-align:right;" |n/a
| style="text-align:right;" |n/a

| style="text-align:left;" | Sam Lawrence (incumbent)
| style="text-align:left;" | Independent Labour Party
| style="text-align:right;" |12,639
| style="text-align:right;" |n/a
| style="text-align:right;" |n/a

| style="text-align:left;" | John Henry Ball
| style="text-align:left;" | Independent
| style="text-align:right;" |12,302
| style="text-align:right;" |n/a
| style="text-align:right;" |n/a

| style="text-align:left;" | Thomas O'Heir
| style="text-align:left;" | Independent
| style="text-align:right;" |7,235
| style="text-align:right;" |n/a
| style="text-align:right;" |n/a
|-
| style="text-align:right;background-color:#FFFFFF;" colspan="3" |Total votes
| style="text-align:right;background-color:#FFFFFF;" |n/a
| style="text-align:right;background-color:#FFFFFF;" |n/a
| style="text-align:right;background-color:#FFFFFF;" |
|-
| style="text-align:right;background-color:#FFFFFF;" colspan="3" |Registered voters
| style="text-align:right;background-color:#FFFFFF;" |n/a
| style="text-align:right;background-color:#FFFFFF;" |n/a
| style="text-align:right;background-color:#FFFFFF;" |n/a
|-
| style="text-align:left;" colspan="6" |Note: Candidate campaign colours are used as a visual differentiation between candidates and to indicate affiliation.
|-
| style="text-align:left;" colspan="13" |Sources: "Board of Control Summary", Hamilton Spectator, Tuesday, December 2, 1930, pp. 10.
|}

Aldermen

Ward One

|-
!rowspan="2" colspan="2"|Candidate
!rowspan="2" colspan="1"|Affiliation
!colspan="3"|Popular vote
|-
! Votes
! %
! ±%
|-

| style="text-align:left;" | William MacFarland (incumbent)
| style="text-align:left;" | Independent
| style="text-align:right;" |3,601
| style="text-align:right;" |n/a
| style="text-align:right;" |n/a
|-

| style="text-align:left;" | Herbert Wilton
| style="text-align:left;" | Independent
| style="text-align:right;" |2,055
| style="text-align:right;" |n/a
| style="text-align:right;" |n/a
|-

| style="text-align:left;" | Fred Brooks
| style="text-align:left;" | Independent
| style="text-align:right;" |1,903
| style="text-align:right;" |n/a
| style="text-align:right;" |n/a
|-
| style="text-align:right;background-color:#FFFFFF;" colspan="3" |Total votes
| style="text-align:right;background-color:#FFFFFF;" |n/a
| style="text-align:right;background-color:#FFFFFF;" |n/a
| style="text-align:right;background-color:#FFFFFF;" |
|-
| style="text-align:right;background-color:#FFFFFF;" colspan="3" |Registered voters
| style="text-align:right;background-color:#FFFFFF;" |n/a
| style="text-align:right;background-color:#FFFFFF;" |n/a
| style="text-align:right;background-color:#FFFFFF;" |n/a
|-
| style="text-align:left;" colspan="6" |Note: Candidate campaign colours are used as a visual differentiation between candidates and to indicate affiliation.
|-
| style="text-align:left;" colspan="13" |Sources: "How Aldermanic Candidates Ran", Hamilton Spectator, Tuesday, December 2, 1930, pp. 10.
|}

Ward Two

|-
!rowspan="2" colspan="2"|Candidate
!rowspan="2" colspan="1"|Affiliation
!colspan="3"|Popular vote
|-
! Votes
! %
! ±%
|-

| style="text-align:left;" | Thomas Wright (incumbent)
| style="text-align:left;" | Independent
| style="text-align:right;" |1,834
| style="text-align:right;" |n/a
| style="text-align:right;" |n/a
|-

| style="text-align:left;" | Gordon Flett (incumbent)
| style="text-align:left;" | Independent
| style="text-align:right;" |1,719
| style="text-align:right;" |n/a
| style="text-align:right;" |n/a
|-

| style="text-align:left;" | William Ainsley
| style="text-align:left;" | Independent Liberal
| style="text-align:right;" |1,508
| style="text-align:right;" |n/a
| style="text-align:right;" |n/a
|-
| style="text-align:right;background-color:#FFFFFF;" colspan="3" |Total votes
| style="text-align:right;background-color:#FFFFFF;" |n/a
| style="text-align:right;background-color:#FFFFFF;" |n/a
| style="text-align:right;background-color:#FFFFFF;" |
|-
| style="text-align:right;background-color:#FFFFFF;" colspan="3" |Registered voters
| style="text-align:right;background-color:#FFFFFF;" |n/a
| style="text-align:right;background-color:#FFFFFF;" |n/a
| style="text-align:right;background-color:#FFFFFF;" |n/a
|-
| style="text-align:left;" colspan="6" |Note: Candidate campaign colours are used as a visual differentiation between candidates and to indicate affiliation.
|-
| style="text-align:left;" colspan="13" |Sources: "How Aldermanic Candidates Ran", Hamilton Spectator, Tuesday, December 2, 1930, pp. 10.
|}

Ward Three

|-
!rowspan="2" colspan="2"|Candidate
!rowspan="2" colspan="1"|Affiliation
!colspan="3"|Popular vote
|-
! Votes
! %
! ±%
|-

| style="text-align:left;" | William Hutton (incumbent)
| style="text-align:left;" | Independent
| style="text-align:right;" |2,369
| style="text-align:right;" |n/a
| style="text-align:right;" |n/a
|-

| style="text-align:left;" | D'Arcy Argue Martin (incumbent)
| style="text-align:left;" | Independent
| style="text-align:right;" |2,313
| style="text-align:right;" |n/a
| style="text-align:right;" |n/a
|-

| style="text-align:left;" | Austin Macaulay
| style="text-align:left;" | Independent
| style="text-align:right;" |1,264
| style="text-align:right;" |n/a
| style="text-align:right;" |n/a
|-

| style="text-align:left;" | Henry Bush
| style="text-align:left;" | Independent
| style="text-align:right;" |604
| style="text-align:right;" |n/a
| style="text-align:right;" |n/a
|-
| style="text-align:right;background-color:#FFFFFF;" colspan="3" |Total votes
| style="text-align:right;background-color:#FFFFFF;" |n/a
| style="text-align:right;background-color:#FFFFFF;" |n/a
| style="text-align:right;background-color:#FFFFFF;" |
|-
| style="text-align:right;background-color:#FFFFFF;" colspan="3" |Registered voters
| style="text-align:right;background-color:#FFFFFF;" |n/a
| style="text-align:right;background-color:#FFFFFF;" |n/a
| style="text-align:right;background-color:#FFFFFF;" |n/a
|-
| style="text-align:left;" colspan="6" |Note: Candidate campaign colours are used as a visual differentiation between candidates and to indicate affiliation.
|-
| style="text-align:left;" colspan="13" |Sources: "How Aldermanic Candidates Ran", Hamilton Spectator, Tuesday, December 2, 1930, pp. 10.
|}

Ward Four

|-
!rowspan="2" colspan="2"|Candidate
!rowspan="2" colspan="1"|Affiliation
!colspan="3"|Popular vote
|-
! Votes
! %
! ±%
|-

| style="text-align:left;" | William Thompson (incumbent)
| style="text-align:left;" | Independent
| style="text-align:right;" |1,284
| style="text-align:right;" |n/a
| style="text-align:right;" |n/a
|-

| style="text-align:left;" | Arthur Davidson
| style="text-align:left;" | Independent
| style="text-align:right;" |1,194
| style="text-align:right;" |n/a
| style="text-align:right;" |n/a
|-

| style="text-align:left;" | George Hancock
| style="text-align:left;" | Independent
| style="text-align:right;" |1,191
| style="text-align:right;" |n/a
| style="text-align:right;" |n/a
|-

| style="text-align:left;" | Peter Cheeseman
| style="text-align:left;" | Independent
| style="text-align:right;" |822
| style="text-align:right;" |n/a
| style="text-align:right;" |n/a
|-

| style="text-align:left;" | Percy Wright
| style="text-align:left;" | Independent
| style="text-align:right;" |448
| style="text-align:right;" |n/a
| style="text-align:right;" |n/a
|-
| style="background-color:#FADA5E;" |
| style="text-align:left;" | Harry Penton
| style="text-align:left;" | Independent Labour Party
| style="text-align:right;" |393
| style="text-align:right;" |n/a
| style="text-align:right;" |n/a
|-

| style="text-align:left;" | Frederick Flatman
| style="text-align:left;" | Independent
| style="text-align:right;" |153
| style="text-align:right;" |n/a
| style="text-align:right;" |n/a
|-

| style="text-align:left;" | Henry Roberts
| style="text-align:left;" | Independent
| style="text-align:right;" |141
| style="text-align:right;" |n/a
| style="text-align:right;" |n/a
|-
| style="text-align:right;background-color:#FFFFFF;" colspan="3" |Total votes
| style="text-align:right;background-color:#FFFFFF;" |n/a
| style="text-align:right;background-color:#FFFFFF;" |n/a
| style="text-align:right;background-color:#FFFFFF;" |
|- 
| style="text-align:right;background-color:#FFFFFF;" colspan="3" |Registered voters
| style="text-align:right;background-color:#FFFFFF;" |n/a
| style="text-align:right;background-color:#FFFFFF;" |n/a
| style="text-align:right;background-color:#FFFFFF;" |n/a
|- 
| style="text-align:left;" colspan="6" |Note: Candidate campaign colours are used as a visual differentiation between candidates and to indicate affiliation.
|- 
| style="text-align:left;" colspan="13" |Sources: "How Aldermanic Candidates Ran", Hamilton Spectator, Tuesday, December 2, 1930, pp. 10.
|}

Ward Five

|-
!rowspan="2" colspan="2"|Candidate
!rowspan="2" colspan="1"|Affiliation
!colspan="3"|Popular vote
|-
! Votes
! %
! ±%
|-

| style="text-align:left;" | John Sherring (incumbent)
| style="text-align:left;" | Independent
| style="text-align:right;" |1,500
| style="text-align:right;" |n/a
| style="text-align:right;" |n/a
|-
| style="background-color:#FADA5E;" |
| style="text-align:left;" | Charles Aitchison (incumbent)
| style="text-align:left;" | Independent Labour Party
| style="text-align:right;" |1,482
| style="text-align:right;" |n/a
| style="text-align:right;" |n/a
|-

| style="text-align:left;" | Albert Marck
| style="text-align:left;" | Independent
| style="text-align:right;" |993
| style="text-align:right;" |n/a
| style="text-align:right;" |n/a
|-

| style="text-align:left;" | Michael Cummings
| style="text-align:left;" | Independent
| style="text-align:right;" |490
| style="text-align:right;" |n/a
| style="text-align:right;" |n/a
|-

| style="text-align:left;" | Fred Amos
| style="text-align:left;" | Independent
| style="text-align:right;" |293
| style="text-align:right;" |n/a
| style="text-align:right;" |n/a
|-
| style="text-align:right;background-color:#FFFFFF;" colspan="3" |Total votes
| style="text-align:right;background-color:#FFFFFF;" |n/a
| style="text-align:right;background-color:#FFFFFF;" |n/a
| style="text-align:right;background-color:#FFFFFF;" |
|- 
| style="text-align:right;background-color:#FFFFFF;" colspan="3" |Registered voters
| style="text-align:right;background-color:#FFFFFF;" |n/a
| style="text-align:right;background-color:#FFFFFF;" |n/a
| style="text-align:right;background-color:#FFFFFF;" |n/a
|- 
| style="text-align:left;" colspan="6" |Note: Candidate campaign colours are used as a visual differentiation between candidates and to indicate affiliation.
|- 
| style="text-align:left;" colspan="13" |Sources: "How Aldermanic Candidates Ran", Hamilton Spectator, Tuesday, December 2, 1930, pp. 10.
|}

Ward Six

|-
!rowspan="2" colspan="2"|Candidate
!rowspan="2" colspan="1"|Affiliation
!colspan="3"|Popular vote
|-
! Votes
! %
! ±%
|-
| style="background-color:#FADA5E;" |
| style="text-align:left;" | Archie Pollock (incumbent)
| style="text-align:left;" | Independent Labour Party
| style="text-align:right;" |2,030
| style="text-align:right;" |n/a
| style="text-align:right;" |n/a
|-

| style="text-align:left;" | John Hodgson (incumbent)
| style="text-align:left;" | Independent
| style="text-align:right;" |1,669
| style="text-align:right;" |n/a
| style="text-align:right;" |n/a
|-

| style="text-align:left;" | Vernon Barker
| style="text-align:left;" | Independent
| style="text-align:right;" |1,035
| style="text-align:right;" |n/a
| style="text-align:right;" |n/a
|-

| style="text-align:left;" | Charles Avery
| style="text-align:left;" | Independent
| style="text-align:right;" |339
| style="text-align:right;" |n/a
| style="text-align:right;" |n/a
|-

| style="text-align:left;" | William Wardley
| style="text-align:left;" | Independent
| style="text-align:right;" |294
| style="text-align:right;" |n/a
| style="text-align:right;" |n/a
|-
| style="text-align:right;background-color:#FFFFFF;" colspan="3" |Total votes
| style="text-align:right;background-color:#FFFFFF;" |n/a
| style="text-align:right;background-color:#FFFFFF;" |n/a
| style="text-align:right;background-color:#FFFFFF;" |
|- 
| style="text-align:right;background-color:#FFFFFF;" colspan="3" |Registered voters
| style="text-align:right;background-color:#FFFFFF;" |n/a
| style="text-align:right;background-color:#FFFFFF;" |n/a
| style="text-align:right;background-color:#FFFFFF;" |n/a
|- 
| style="text-align:left;" colspan="6" |Note: Candidate campaign colours are used as a visual differentiation between candidates and to indicate affiliation.
|- 
| style="text-align:left;" colspan="13" |Sources: "How Aldermanic Candidates Ran", Hamilton Spectator, Tuesday, December 2, 1930, pp. 10.
|}

Ward Seven

|-
!rowspan="2" colspan="2"|Candidate
!rowspan="2" colspan="1"|Affiliation
!colspan="3"|Popular vote
|-
! Votes
! %
! ±%
|-
| style="background-color:#FADA5E;" |
| style="text-align:left;" | Samuel Clarke (incumbent)
| style="text-align:left;" | Independent Labour Party
| style="text-align:right;" |2,091
| style="text-align:right;" |n/a
| style="text-align:right;" |n/a
|-

| style="text-align:left;" | Archie Burton (incumbent)
| style="text-align:left;" | Independent
| style="text-align:right;" |1,694
| style="text-align:right;" |n/a
| style="text-align:right;" |n/a
|-

| style="text-align:left;" | Paul Oliveri
| style="text-align:left;" | Independent
| style="text-align:right;" |600
| style="text-align:right;" |n/a
| style="text-align:right;" |n/a
|-

| style="text-align:left;" | William Patterson
| style="text-align:left;" | Independent
| style="text-align:right;" |365
| style="text-align:right;" |n/a
| style="text-align:right;" |n/a
|-
| style="text-align:right; background-color:#FFFFFF" colspan="3" |Total votes
| style="text-align:right; background-color:#FFFFFF"|n/a
| style="text-align:right; background-color:#FFFFFF"|n/a
| style="text-align:right; background-color:#FFFFFF"|
|- 
| style="text-align:right; background-color:#FFFFFF" colspan="3" |Registered voters
| style="text-align:right; background-color:#FFFFFF"|n/a
| style="text-align:right; background-color:#FFFFFF"|n/a
| style="text-align:right; background-color:#FFFFFF"|n/a
|- 
| style="text-align:left;" colspan="6"|Note: Candidate campaign colours are used as a visual differentiation between candidates and to indicate affiliation.
|- 
| style="text-align:left;" colspan="13"|Sources: "How Aldermanic Candidates Ran", Hamilton Spectator, Tuesday, December 2, 1930, pp. 10.
|}

Ward Eight

|-
!rowspan="2" colspan="2"|Candidate
!rowspan="2" colspan="1"|Affiliation
!colspan="3"|Popular vote
|-
! Votes
! %
! ±%
|-
| style="background-color:#FADA5E;" |
| style="text-align:left;" | John Mitchell (incumbent)
| style="text-align:left;" | Independent Labour Party
| style="text-align:right;" |3,331
| style="text-align:right;" |n/a
| style="text-align:right;" |n/a
|-
| style="background-color:#FADA5E;" |
| style="text-align:left;" | James Reed 
| style="text-align:left;" | Independent Labour Party
| style="text-align:right;" |2,203
| style="text-align:right;" |n/a
| style="text-align:right;" |n/a
|-
| style="background-color:#B0E0E6;" |
| style="text-align:left;" | Archie Burton (incumbent)
| style="text-align:left;" | Policy for 1933
| style="text-align:right;" |2,089
| style="text-align:right;" |n/a
| style="text-align:right;" |n/a
|-
| style="background-color:#C41E3A;" |
| style="text-align:left;" | James Walker
| style="text-align:left;" | Communist Party
| style="text-align:right;" |1,288
| style="text-align:right;" |n/a
| style="text-align:right;" |n/a
|-

| style="text-align:left;" | Nathaniel Moore
| style="text-align:left;" | Independent
| style="text-align:right;" |853
| style="text-align:right;" |n/a
| style="text-align:right;" |n/a
|-
| style="text-align:right;background-color:#FFFFFF;" colspan="3" |Total votes
| style="text-align:right;background-color:#FFFFFF;" |n/a
| style="text-align:right;background-color:#FFFFFF;" |n/a
| style="text-align:right;background-color:#FFFFFF;" |
|- 
| style="text-align:right;background-color:#FFFFFF;" colspan="3" |Registered voters
| style="text-align:right;background-color:#FFFFFF;" |n/a
| style="text-align:right;background-color:#FFFFFF;" |n/a
| style="text-align:right;background-color:#FFFFFF;" |n/a
|- 
| style="text-align:left;" colspan="6" |Note: Candidate campaign colours are used as a visual differentiation between candidates and to indicate affiliation.
|- 
| style="text-align:left;" colspan="13" |Sources: "How Aldermanic Candidates Ran", Hamilton Spectator, Tuesday, December 6, 1932, pp. 16.
|}

Board of Education

Ward One

|-
!rowspan="2" colspan="2"|Candidate
!rowspan="2" colspan="1"|Affiliation
!colspan="3"|Popular vote
|-
! Votes
! %
! ±%
|-

| style="text-align:left;" | George Cameron Gage (incumbent)
| style="text-align:left;" | Independent
| style="text-align:right;" |3,595
| style="text-align:right;" |80.2%
| style="text-align:right;" |n/a
|-
| style="background-color:#FADA5E;" |
| style="text-align:left;" | George Thornewell
| style="text-align:left;" | Independent Labour Party
| style="text-align:right;" |887
| style="text-align:right;" |19.8%
| style="text-align:right;" |n/a
|-
| style="text-align:right;background-color:#FFFFFF;" colspan="3" |Total votes
| style="text-align:right;background-color:#FFFFFF;" |4,482
| style="text-align:right;background-color:#FFFFFF;" |n/a
| style="text-align:right;background-color:#FFFFFF;" |
|- 
| style="text-align:right;background-color:#FFFFFF;" colspan="3" |Registered voters
| style="text-align:right;background-color:#FFFFFF;" |n/a
| style="text-align:right;background-color:#FFFFFF;" |n/a
| style="text-align:right;background-color:#FFFFFF;" |n/a
|- 
| style="text-align:left;" colspan="6" |Note: Candidate campaign colours are used as a visual differentiation between candidates and to indicate affiliation.
|- 
| style="text-align:left;" colspan="13" |Sources: "School Trustees", Hamilton Spectator, Tuesday, December 2, 1930, pg. 10.
|}

Ward Two

|-
!rowspan="2" colspan="2"|Candidate
!rowspan="2" colspan="1"|Affiliation
!colspan="3"|Popular vote
|-
! Votes
! %
! ±%
|-

| style="text-align:left;" | Dr. J. W. Bell
| style="text-align:left;" | Independent
!colspan="3" style="text-align:center;" | Acclaimed
|-
| style="text-align:right;background-color:#FFFFFF;" colspan="3" |Total votes
| style="text-align:right;background-color:#FFFFFF;" |n/a
| style="text-align:right;background-color:#FFFFFF;" |n/a
| style="text-align:right;background-color:#FFFFFF;" |
|- 
| style="text-align:right;background-color:#FFFFFF;" colspan="3" |Registered voters
| style="text-align:right;background-color:#FFFFFF;" |n/a
| style="text-align:right;background-color:#FFFFFF;" |n/a
| style="text-align:right;background-color:#FFFFFF;" |n/a
|- 
| style="text-align:left;" colspan="6" |Note: Candidate campaign colours are used as a visual differentiation between candidates and to indicate affiliation.
|- 
| style="text-align:left;" colspan="13" |Sources: "School Trustees", Hamilton Spectator, Tuesday, December 2, 1930, pg. 10.
|}

Ward Three

|-
!rowspan="2" colspan="2"|Candidate
!rowspan="2" colspan="1"|Affiliation
!colspan="3"|Popular vote
|-
! Votes
! %
! ±%
|-

| style="text-align:left;" | George Ballard
| style="text-align:left;" | Independent
!colspan="3" style="text-align:center;" | Acclaimed
|-
| style="text-align:right;background-color:#FFFFFF;" colspan="3" |Total votes
| style="text-align:right;background-color:#FFFFFF;" |n/a
| style="text-align:right;background-color:#FFFFFF;" |n/a
| style="text-align:right;background-color:#FFFFFF;" |
|- 
| style="text-align:right;background-color:#FFFFFF;" colspan="3" |Registered voters
| style="text-align:right;background-color:#FFFFFF;" |n/a
| style="text-align:right;background-color:#FFFFFF;" |n/a
| style="text-align:right;background-color:#FFFFFF;" |n/a
|- 
| style="text-align:left;" colspan="6" |Note: Candidate campaign colours are used as a visual differentiation between candidates and to indicate affiliation.
|- 
| style="text-align:left;" colspan="13" |Sources: "School Trustees", Hamilton Spectator, Tuesday, December 2, 1930, pg. 10.
|}

Ward Four

|-
!rowspan="2" colspan="2"|Candidate
!rowspan="2" colspan="1"|Affiliation
!colspan="3"|Popular vote
|-
! Votes
! %
! ±%
|-

| style="text-align:left;" | Emerson Mealley
| style="text-align:left;" | Independent
!colspan="3" style="text-align:center;" | Acclaimed
|-
| style="text-align:right;background-color:#FFFFFF;" colspan="3" |Total votes
| style="text-align:right;background-color:#FFFFFF;" |n/a
| style="text-align:right;background-color:#FFFFFF;" |n/a
| style="text-align:right;background-color:#FFFFFF;" |
|- 
| style="text-align:right;background-color:#FFFFFF;" colspan="3" |Registered voters
| style="text-align:right;background-color:#FFFFFF;" |n/a
| style="text-align:right;background-color:#FFFFFF;" |n/a
| style="text-align:right;background-color:#FFFFFF;" |n/a
|- 
| style="text-align:left;" colspan="6" |Note: Candidate campaign colours are used as a visual differentiation between candidates and to indicate affiliation.
|- 
| style="text-align:left;" colspan="13" |Sources: "School Trustees", Hamilton Spectator, Tuesday, December 2, 1930, pg. 10.
|}

Ward Five

|-
!rowspan="2" colspan="2"|Candidate
!rowspan="2" colspan="1"|Affiliation
!colspan="3"|Popular vote
|-
! Votes
! %
! ±%
|-

| style="text-align:left;" | Thomas Binkley (incumbent)
| style="text-align:left;" | Independent
| style="text-align:right;" |1,418
| style="text-align:right;" |61.76%
| style="text-align:right;" |n/a
|-

| style="text-align:left;" | Charles Levinson
| style="text-align:left;" | Independent
| style="text-align:right;" |878
| style="text-align:right;" |38.24%
| style="text-align:right;" |n/a
|-
| style="text-align:right;background-color:#FFFFFF;" colspan="3" |Total votes
| style="text-align:right;background-color:#FFFFFF;" |2,296
| style="text-align:right;background-color:#FFFFFF;" |n/a
| style="text-align:right;background-color:#FFFFFF;" |
|- 
| style="text-align:right;background-color:#FFFFFF;" colspan="3" |Registered voters
| style="text-align:right;background-color:#FFFFFF;" |n/a
| style="text-align:right;background-color:#FFFFFF;" |n/a
| style="text-align:right;background-color:#FFFFFF;" |n/a
|- 
| style="text-align:left;" colspan="6" |Note: Candidate campaign colours are used as a visual differentiation between candidates and to indicate affiliation.
|- 
| style="text-align:left;" colspan="13" |Sources: "School Trustees", Hamilton Spectator, Tuesday, December 2, 1930, pg. 10.
|}

Ward Six

|-
!rowspan="2" colspan="2"|Candidate
!rowspan="2" colspan="1"|Affiliation
!colspan="3"|Popular vote
|-
! Votes
! %
! ±%
|-

| style="text-align:left;" | Frank Robbins
| style="text-align:left;" | Independent
!colspan="3" style="text-align:center;" | Acclaimed
|-
| style="text-align:right;background-color:#FFFFFF;" colspan="3" |Total votes
| style="text-align:right;background-color:#FFFFFF;" |n/a
| style="text-align:right;background-color:#FFFFFF;" |n/a
| style="text-align:right;background-color:#FFFFFF;" |
|- 
| style="text-align:right;background-color:#FFFFFF;" colspan="3" |Registered voters
| style="text-align:right;background-color:#FFFFFF;" |n/a
| style="text-align:right;background-color:#FFFFFF;" |n/a
| style="text-align:right;background-color:#FFFFFF;" |n/a
|- 
| style="text-align:left;" colspan="6" |Note: Candidate campaign colours are used as a visual differentiation between candidates and to indicate affiliation.
|- 
| style="text-align:left;" colspan="13" |Sources: "School Trustees", Hamilton Spectator, Tuesday, December 2, 1930, pg. 10.
|}

Ward Seven

|-
!rowspan="2" colspan="2"|Candidate
!rowspan="2" colspan="1"|Affiliation
!colspan="3"|Popular vote
|-
! Votes
! %
! ±%
|-

| style="text-align:left;" | Orville Walsh 
| style="text-align:left;" | Independent
| style="text-align:right;" |1,483
| style="text-align:right;" |58.36%
| style="text-align:right;" |n/a
|-
| style="background-color:#FADA5E;" |
| style="text-align:left;" | James Reed
| style="text-align:left;" | Independent Labour Party
| style="text-align:right;" |1,058
| style="text-align:right;" |41.64%
| style="text-align:right;" |n/a
|-
| style="text-align:right;background-color:#FFFFFF;" colspan="3" |Total votes
| style="text-align:right;background-color:#FFFFFF;" |2,541
| style="text-align:right;background-color:#FFFFFF;" |n/a
| style="text-align:right;background-color:#FFFFFF;" |
|- 
| style="text-align:right;background-color:#FFFFFF;" colspan="3" |Registered voters
| style="text-align:right;background-color:#FFFFFF;" |n/a
| style="text-align:right;background-color:#FFFFFF;" |n/a
| style="text-align:right;background-color:#FFFFFF;" |n/a
|- 
| style="text-align:left;" colspan="6" |Note: Candidate campaign colours are used as a visual differentiation between candidates and to indicate affiliation.
|- 
| style="text-align:left;" colspan="13" |Sources: "School Trustees", Hamilton Spectator, Tuesday, December 2, 1930, pg. 10.
|}

Ward Eight

|-
!rowspan="2" colspan="2"|Candidate
!rowspan="2" colspan="1"|Affiliation
!colspan="3"|Popular vote
|-
! Votes
! %
! ±%
|-
| style="background-color:#FADA5E;" |
| style="text-align:left;" | Agnes Sharpe
| style="text-align:left;" | Independent Labour Party
| style="text-align:right;" |2,375
| style="text-align:right;" |70.12%
| style="text-align:right;" |n/a
|-

| style="text-align:left;" | Emmett Scarlett
| style="text-align:left;" | Independent
| style="text-align:right;" |1,012
| style="text-align:right;" |29.88%
| style="text-align:right;" |n/a
|-
| style="text-align:right;background-color:#FFFFFF;" colspan="3" |Total votes
| style="text-align:right;background-color:#FFFFFF;" |3,387
| style="text-align:right;background-color:#FFFFFF;" |n/a
| style="text-align:right;background-color:#FFFFFF;" |
|- 
| style="text-align:right;background-color:#FFFFFF;" colspan="3" |Registered voters
| style="text-align:right;background-color:#FFFFFF;" |n/a
| style="text-align:right;background-color:#FFFFFF;" |n/a
| style="text-align:right;background-color:#FFFFFF;" |n/a
|- 
| style="text-align:left;" colspan="6" |Note: Candidate campaign colours are used as a visual differentiation between candidates and to indicate affiliation.
|- 
| style="text-align:left;" colspan="13" |Sources: "School Trustees", Hamilton Spectator, Tuesday, December 2, 1930, pg. 10.
|}

References

1930 Ontario municipal elections
1930